This is a list of members of the Argentine Senate from 10 December 2011 to 9 December 2013.

Composition
as of 9 December 2013

Senate leadership

Election cycles

List of senators

Notes

References

External links
List on the official website (archived) 

2011-2013
2011 in Argentina
2012 in Argentina
2013 in Argentina